Aliabad-e Yalghuz Aghaj (also Romanized as ‘Alīābād-e Yālghūz Āghāj; also known as ‘Alīābād) is a village in Yalghuz Aghaj Rural District, Serishabad District, Qorveh County, Kurdistan Province, Iran. At the 2006 census, its population was 270, in 62 families. The village is populated by Kurds.

References 

Towns and villages in Qorveh County
Kurdish settlements in Kurdistan Province